Wu Chao can refer to:

 Wu Chao (skier) (吴超, b. 1987)
 Wu Chao (weightlifter) (伍超, b. 1992)
 Wu Zetian, Chinese empress (624-705) (Wade–Giles spelling of alternative name 武曌)
 Wu Chao (actor), in the 2012 film Bunshinsaba (2012 film)
 Wu Chao (Three Kingdoms) (伍朝, c. 200 CE), scholar, see List of people of the Three Kingdoms (W)
 Wu Chao (judoka), silver medalist in 2010 East Asian Judo Championships
 Kro's Nest, chain of pizza restaurants in Beijing (pinyin: Wū Cháo)

See also
 Wuchao, supply cache during the Battle of Guandu (200 CE), see Battle of Guandu#The raid on Wuchao